Huampo or Wamp'u (Quechua for boat, also spelled Huampu) is a mountain in the Cordillera Negra in the Andes of Peru which reaches a height of approximately . It is located in the Ancash Region, Huaylas Province, Pamparomas District.

References

Mountains of Peru
Mountains of Ancash Region